Alaiyadikkuthu is a 2005 Indian Tamil-language thriller film written and directed by Kalimuthu and starring Sindhu Tolani, Naveen Dhanush and Akhil Kumar. It was released on 10 August 2005.

Cast
Sindhu Tolani as Brindha
Naveen Dhanush
Akhil Kumar
Yugendran
Anand
Kazan Khan
Vennira Aadai Moorthy
Ghilli Sekhar
Minnal Lakshmanan
Neha Tolani
Prabha Reddy
Vijayan
Rami Reddy
Kovai Senthil

Production
Sindhu Tolani turned down offers to star in Telugu films to work on Alaiyadikkuthu after being impressed by the story. Sindhu's sister, Neha Tolani, was also cast in a role, as was debutant Prabha Reddy. Naveen Dhanush and Aari Arujunan made their acting debuts in the film, with the latter appearing under the name of Akhil Kumar.

Prior to release, it was reported that the film was partially based on the Kanchi Shankaracharyas controversy. In June 2005, director K. Rajan chose to shelve his biopic of Sivakasi Jayalakshmi titled Niram Maraiya Rojakal starring Vindhya, after he felt it was quite similar to Alaiyadikkuthu.

Soundtrack

Reception
The film was released on 10 August 2005 across Tamil Nadu. A critic from Sify gave the film a negative review, adding that "Sindhu Tolani as the female crusader and vigilante is adequate though she has to improve in emotional scenes" and that the film "needed more sensitive treatment". A critic from NowRunning.com wrote "though the movie is realistic, relevant and to some extent revitalizing, it misses on a point that you do not feel or sympathize for the pains suffered by victims of lascivious men". A reviewer from BizHat noted the film was "screeching, hysterical and distasteful".

In September 2006, Kalimuthu announced a follow-up venture titled Minnaladikkuthu starring Namitha in the lead role, with the same producers. However, the film eventually did not have a theatrical release.

References

External links

2005 films
2005 drama films
Indian drama films
2000s Tamil-language films
2000s feminist films
Films about women in India